Hasanabad-e Abu ol Fath (also Romanized as Ḩasanābād-e Abū ol Fatḩ and Ḩasanābād Abū ol Fatḩ; also known as Bū ol Fatḩ-e Kūchek and Ḩasanābād) is a village in Liravi-ye Miyani Rural District, Imam Hassan District, Deylam County, Bushehr Province, Iran. At the 2006 census, its population was 77, in 20 families.

References 

Populated places in Deylam County